David Vega Hernández and Mark Vervoort were the defending champions but chose not to defend their title.

Román Andrés Burruchaga and Facundo Díaz Acosta won the title after defeating Nicolás Álvarez Varona and Alberto Barroso Campos 7–5, 6–7(8–10), [10–7] in the final.

Seeds

Draw

References

External links
 Main draw

Copa Sevilla - Doubles
2022 Doubles